Thomas Wade (born in 1909) was a professional footballer who played as a defender for Huddersfield Town & Darlington.

1909 births
Year of death missing
Footballers from Leeds
English footballers
Association football fullbacks
English Football League players
Huddersfield Town A.F.C. players
Darlington F.C. players